Anton van Anrooy (11 January 1870 – 13 February 1949) was a British painter. His work was part of the art competitions at the 1928 Summer Olympics and the 1932 Summer Olympics.

References

1870 births
1949 deaths
20th-century British painters
British male painters
Olympic competitors in art competitions
People from Zaltbommel
19th-century British male artists
20th-century British male artists